This is a List of Royal Air Force ferry units.

Ferry

Flights

 No. 1689 (Ferry Pool Pilot Training) Flight RAF

Units

Crew pools

Pilots pools

Pools

Training units

Other units

Aircraft

See also

Royal Air Force

List of Royal Air Force aircraft squadrons
List of Royal Air Force aircraft independent flights
List of conversion units of the Royal Air Force
List of Royal Air Force Glider units
List of Royal Air Force Operational Training Units
List of Royal Air Force schools
List of Royal Air Force units & establishments
List of RAF squadron codes
List of RAF Regiment units
List of Battle of Britain squadrons
List of wings of the Royal Air Force
Royal Air Force roundels

Army Air Corps

List of Army Air Corps aircraft units

Fleet Air Arm

List of Fleet Air Arm aircraft squadrons
List of Fleet Air Arm groups
List of aircraft units of the Royal Navy
List of aircraft wings of the Royal Navy

Others

List of Air Training Corps squadrons
University Air Squadron
Air Experience Flight
Volunteer Gliding Squadron
United Kingdom military aircraft serial numbers
United Kingdom aircraft test serials
British military aircraft designation systems

References

Citations

Bibliography

Ferry units